This is the list of the Indian Bengali in the year 1968.

A-Z of films

References

External links
 Tollywood films of 1968 at the Internet Movie Database

1968
Bengali
Films, Bengali